The Heinkel P.1073 (He P.1073), known also as Strahljäger (Jet fighter), was a fighter project developed for the Luftwaffe by Heinkel aircraft manufacturing company during the last years of World War II.

Development
In 1944 Heinkel produced different designs of the project using either two Heinkel HeS 011 or two BMW 003 axial-flow turbojets. One of the turbojets was placed on top of the fuselage and the other in a ventral position. The engine below the fuselage was placed asymmetrically in order to provide space for the retractable front undercarriage wheel. The designs of this aircraft would be used by Heinkel to develop the He 162 Volksjäger, which used only one turbojet engine, towards the end of 1944.

Variants
Heinkel produced twenty variants of the project between July 6 and October 3, 1944. All variants would have been armed with two 30 mm MK 108 cannons.

He P.1073 01 4 
This was the original design of the jet-powered fighter project. It had a v-tail and swept wings fitted with a streamlined 500 liter fuel tank on each wing.

He P.1073 01 8 
Project for a high-altitude reconnaissance aircraft. It was also a slightly asymmetric jet-powered plane like the earlier design, but with the cockpit located at the front end of the fuselage. The design included an alternative version with a high aspect ratio upswept wing.

He P. 1073 02
A variant with forward-swept wing.

Specifications

See also

References

External links

Heinkel He P.1073 fighter image 
Heinkel P.1073 Model

Abandoned military aircraft projects of Germany
World War II fighter aircraft of Germany
P1073
World War II jet aircraft of Germany
V-tail aircraft